Maria Carlsson-Augstein (born 1937) is a former German female literary translator. She was fluent in English and has translated numerous English literary works in German language.

Biography 
Maria Carlsson was born in 1937. She was married to German journalist Hans-Joachim Sperr. After Sperr's death, she married Rudolf Augstein in 1968. They had two children, Franziska Augstein and Jakob Augstein. They got divorced in 1970. Following her ex-husband's death in 2002, she informed her son that his biological father was in fact novelist Martin Walser.<ref>Gerrit Bartels: Augstein und Walser. Vater und Sohn: Eine gewisse Ähnlichkeit. In: Der Tagesspiegel. 28 November 2009. Retrieved 25 March 2012.</ref>

 Literature career 
Carlsson has been working as a translator of literary works which are derived from the English language since the 1950s, and has translated numerous John Updike popular literary works such as Memories of the time under Ford, The Party in the evening, I never was happy, Golf dreams''.

In 1994, she was awarded the Heinrich Maria Ledig-Rowohit Prize and in 2002 she received Helmut M. Braem Translator Prize for her outstanding translations of the literary works from English to German language.

References 

1937 births
Living people
German translators